Tews is a surname. Notable people with the surname include:

 Andreas Tews (born 1968), German amateur boxer
 George L. Tews (1883–1936), machinist, businessman and real estate broker from Milwaukee

See also
 Tew's Falls, waterfall in Hamilton, Ontario, Canada
 AN/ALQ-135, produced for the Tactical Electronic Warfare Suite (TEWS)

Surnames from given names
Low German surnames